Canton 10 or Herzeg-Bosnian Canton is the largest of the cantons of the Federation of Bosnia and Herzegovina by area and eighth by population. The local government seat is in Livno, while the assembly is in Tomislavgrad.

Name, symbols and language

In Croatian, the term županija is used, while in Bosnian and Serbian the term is kanton/кантон. The canton is officially referred by the Federation of Bosnia and Herzegovina as Canton 10 (Kanton 10 or Županija 10). The local government refers to it as the Herzeg-Bosnia County, in Croatian Hercegbosanska županija, and uses that name in the local constitution. This name was declared unconstitutional by the Constitutional Court of the Federation because "neither part of the territory of the canton belongs to Herzegovina as a region". Other names used at the national level include North Herzegovina Canton (Sjevernohercegovački kanton, Sjevernohercegovačka županija) and Livno Canton (Livanjski kanton), after its capital.

The coat of arms of the canton under its constitution is a variant of the historical Croatian coat of arms. The flag is a horizontal tricolour of red, white and blue, with the coat of arms in the middle. These symbols were used by the former Croatian Republic of Herzeg-Bosnia. The West Herzegovina Canton also uses this flag and coat of arms. Their use as the official symbols of the canton was deemed unconstitutional by the Constitutional Court of the Federation, because "they only represented one constituent nation". The local government continues to use the flag and the coat of arms at plates at the official institutions.

The constitution lists Croatian and Bosnian languages and the Latin script as official in the canton.

History 

Originally occupied by the Dalmatae, the area of Canton 10 was annexed in 15 AD by the Roman Empire and formed part of the Roman province of Dalmatia. After the introduction of Christianity, Delminium (Tomislavgrad) is the seat of the bishopric.

These years also see the creation of the city of Livno. In 892 was recorded the first written appearance of the name of Livno which was the seat of one of counties of the Kingdom of Croatia. The region is attached in the ninth century to the Kingdom of the Croats and later in the 14th century to the Kingdom of Bosnia. After the death of the king of Bosnia, Tvrtko I in 1391, the power of the Kingdom of Bosnia gradually declines and the region is taken over by the Kingdom of Croatia, the state and associated to the Kingdom of Hungary by a personal union.

In the sixteenth century the region was fully integrated for four centuries within the Ottoman Empire. Under the Ottoman Empire, peasants who remained Catholic or Orthodox were hostile to Turkish officials and to islamized landowners.

In the nineteenth century, several uprisings and rebellions against Muslim authorities erupted in Bosnia and Herzegovina. Suffering under oppression by the authorities and furious after the Muslim authorities had killed the Catholic spiritual leader of this region, Lovro Karaula, Franciscan priest, the Catholics of Livno rose up against Ottoman rule on July 20, 1875. Soon, the Catholics from across the region joined this uprising. The rebel leaders were two Franciscan priests, Stjepan Krešić and Bonaventura Šarić-Drženjak. For three years, the insurgency controlled the mountainous regions of Glamoč, Livno, Kupres and Grahovo. When the Austrian army arrived in the Livno region in 1878, the insurgents handed over their arms to the Austrians. The Austro-Hungarian troops met in this region an opposition, both of the Muslim population and the Orthodox population, fighting battles in the vicinity of Livno. The region is liberated at the end of the summer of 1878.

Austria-Hungary occupied the region militarily and Bosnia and Herzegovina after the 1878 Berlin Congress. This period is marked by industrialization and westernization. Architecturally, many public buildings were built and many Catholic religious buildings were erected that were banned during the Ottoman era.

After World War I, the area of Hercegbosna county was in the Kingdom of Serbs, Croats and Slovenes, later Yugoslavia. Most of the present-day area of Hercegbosna County belonged to the then Travnik area in 1922, while the smaller northern parts belonged to the Bišćan area. After the introduction of the January 6 dictatorship and the division of the state into banovinas in 1929, most of the Croatian areas of Hercegbosna county became part of Primorska banovina with headquarters in Split, while the northern Serbian areas were annexed to Vrbas banovina, with headquarters in Banja Luka. With the creation of Croatian Banovina in 1939, all of Primorska Banovina became part of it, including the majority Croat areas of Hercegbosna County.

After the creation of the NDH and its administrative division, most of the area of today's Hercegbosna County was part of the Great Parish of Pliva and Rama with its seat in Jajce, while the smaller northern part belonged to the Great Parish of Krbava and Psata with its seat in Bihać. After the defeat of the Axis powers in 1945, the area of Hercegbosna County became part of the then federal unit of SFR Yugoslavia, Bosnia and Herzegovina. During the democratic process, most of the Croatian municipalities in the county, Kupres, Livno and Tomislavgrad, became part of the Croatian Republic of Herceg-Bosna.

With the independence of Bosnia and Herzegovina in the northern and western part of Hercegbosna County under the leadership of the SDS, the Serb majority areas sided with the Army of Republika Srpska killing Croats and Bosniaks in Drvar, Grahovo, Glamoc, attacking Kupres and shelling Livno and surrounding settlements. After the formation of HVO military units, first the Kupres area was liberated. Croats and Bosniaks formed the Federation of Bosnia and Herzegovina through the Washington Agreement, which included the entire area of Hercegbosna County under HVO control, and a little later, in the summer of 1995, HVO and HV defeated Serb forces decisively. They attacked and captured Grahovo, Glamoč and Drvar, which, together with other victories of the HVO, HV and the RBiH Army, created the conditions for the signing of the Dayton Peace Agreement. After the war, in 1996, Herceg-Bosna self-abolished and FBiH was organized into counties, when Hercegbosna County, the largest county in FBiH, was created.

The Constitution of Herzeg-Bosnia Canton was adopted by the Cantonal Assembly on December 19, 1996.

Geography 

The region is located between Dalmatia to the west, Una-Sana Canton to the north, Central Bosnia Canton to the east and West Herzegovina Canton and Herzegovina-Neretva Canton to the south and southeast.

The natural and geographical features of this area are diverse, ranging from fertile and vast fields and vast pastures, rivers and lakes to centuries-old deciduous and evergreen forests, and provide abundant opportunities for life and economic development based on agricultural production, livestock and the timber industry. . The ecologically clean and unspoiled nature, the mild continental climate, the geographical position and the proximity and good transport connections with neighboring Croatia, i.e. its gateway to the world, Central Dalmatia, and the connection with the whole of Herzegovina, are important factors for economic progress in this area.

Topography

Mountainous terrain of the region is a part of the Dinaric Alps, linked from a fold and thrust belt dating from the late Jurassic period, itself part of the Alpine orogeny, extending southeast from the southern Alps. The Dinarides form part of a chain of mountains that stretch across southern Europe and isolate Pannonian Basin from the Mediterranean Sea.

Political subdivisions 

Canton 10 includes 6 municipalities: Drvar, Bosansko Grahovo, Glamoč, Kupres, Livno and Tomislavgrad.

Governance 

The canton is governed by the Government of Canton 10. The current government is a coalition of 2 parties led by Croatian Democratic Union.

Government 

The Government of the Canton 10 is led by the prime minister who has one deputy and it consists of seven ministries. The ministries have different seats, with two ministries being seated in Tomislavgrad, and the rest in Livno.

Cantonal Assembly 

The Cantonal Assembly (Bosnian and ) is the parliament of the Canton 10. It consists of 25 representatives elected by proportional representation for four-year terms of office.

Demographics

According to the 1991 census, 115.682 people inhabited the canton. Croats comprised 51.5%, Serbs comprised 35.7% and Bosnian Muslims comprised 10.4% of the population. Croats overwhelmingly lived in the southeastern part of the canton (Livno, Kupres, Tomislavgrad), while Serbs lived in northwestern (Grahovo, Glamoč, Drvar). There was a significant population migration during the war (1992–95). In 1992, Serb forces captured Kupres and the surrounding area, pushing away most of the non-Serb population. Croats returned at the end of 1994, after their forces have retaken Kupres. After Croat forces captured Grahovo, Glamoč and Drvar in the summer and fall of 1995, most of the Serb population fled. Refugee Croats from other parts of Bosnia and Herzegovina (fleeing Serb or Bosniak forces) settled in the abandoned area previously inhabited by the Serbs. After the war, under UN and peace implementation forces' pressure, Serb refugees returned to their homes.

In 2013, Canton's population included approximately 77% Croats, 13% Serbs and 9.6% Bosniaks; all other ethnicities combined made up the remaining <0.4%. Canton 10 had the largest share of ethnic Serbs in the Federation of Bosnia and Herzegovina. However, their number has steadily decreased since the conclusion of the Bosnian War.

1991 Census

2013 Census

Economy

The canton has significant natural resources, with large reserves of coal and timber, as well as hydro & wind power.
Due to economic reasons (insufficient canton revenues compared to expenses) unification with West Herzegovina Canton has been proposed.

The pre-war economic recession, and certainly the war in this area, caused significant population fluctuations in the form of emigration to Western European countries or relocation to other areas of Bosnia and Herzegovina.

The natural and geographical features of this area are diverse, from fertile and vast fields and vast pastures, rivers and lakes to centuries-old deciduous and evergreen forests, and provide abundant opportunities for life and economic development based on agricultural production, livestock and the timber industry. The ecologically clean and intact nature, the temperate continental climate, the geographical position and the proximity and good transport connections with other parts of Bosnia and Herzegovina and neighboring Croatia, especially Dalmatia, which traditionally and economically gravitate, are important factors for the economic development of this area. The canton suffered severe damage during the last war and is one of the worst affected areas in the Federation of Bosnia and Herzegovina. The rebuilding process is slow and difficult, but the economy is already showing signs of recovery, mainly visible in the construction, wood processing industry, small business and handicrafts segment. Although commerce is still the dominant branch of the economy, in terms of the total number of companies (191 or 44.50% of the total of 429 active companies and 30% of total income).

Viewed from the revenue aspect of 1998 and 1999, there was a significant increase in construction, agriculture and forestry, as well as transportation, industry and mining. Commerce registered a decrease in income compared to 1998 by 2 index points, as well as a decrease in the participation in total income at the cantonal level from 44.80% in 1998 to 30% in 1999 in favor of other productive activities, and especially construction agriculture and forestry, especially if we take into account that the total income generated at the cantonal level in 1999 increased by 25% compared to 1998. All these are positive indicators of economic recovery and the basis of the expected future development.

The main economic branches of Canton 10 according to the number of employees are the wholesale and retail trade, the processing industry and agriculture, forestry and fishing.

The average salary in Canton 10 is 840 km (2014). The highest average net salary is paid in Bosanski Grahovo (986 km) and the lowest in Tomislavgrad (766 km).

See also
List of heads of the Canton 10
Tropolje

References

External links

Official site

 
Cantons of the Federation of Bosnia and Herzegovina